Aeolochroma is a genus of moths in the family Geometridae described by Prout in 1912.

Species
Species group 1
Aeolochroma albifusaria (Walker, 1866)
Aeolochroma albifusaria albifusaria (Walker, 1866) (=Actenochroma discolor Warren, 1896)
Aeolochroma albifusaria suffusa Prout, 1927
Aeolochroma bakeri Prout, 1913
Aeolochroma intima Prout, 1913
Aeolochroma languida (Warren, 1898) (=Hypochroma rufivaria Warren, 1907)
Aeolochroma modesta (Warren, 1903)
Aeolochroma prasina (Warren, 1896)
Aeolochroma prasina prasina (Warren, 1896)
Aeolochroma prasina angustifascia Prout, 1916
Aeolochroma prasina defasciata Prout, 1916
Aeolochroma prasina louisa Prout, 1927
Aeolochroma prasina spadiocampa Prout, 1917
Aeolochroma saturataria (Walker, 1866) (=Actenochroma caesia Warren, 1896, Hypochroma perfulvata Warren, 1899)
Aeolochroma turneri (Lucas, 1890)
Aeolochroma venia Prout, 1924
Aeolochroma viridimedia Prout, 1916
Aeolochroma viridimedia viridimedia Prout, 1916
Aeolochroma viridimedia recta Prout, 1929
Other species
Aeolochroma acanthina (Meyrick, 1888)
Aeolochroma amethystina (Warren, 1907)
Aeolochroma chioneschatia Prout, 1924
Aeolochroma hypochromaria (Guenée, [1858])
Aeolochroma hypochromaria hypochromaria (Guenée, [1858]) (=Pseudoterpna bryophanes Turner, 1904)
Aeolochroma hypochromaria caledonica Holloway, 1979
Aeolochroma melaleucae (Goldfinch, 1929)
Aeolochroma metarhodata (Walker, [1863])
Aeolochroma mniaria (Goldfinch, 1929)
Aeolochroma olivia (Goldfinch, 1943)
Aeolochroma pammiges (Turner, 1941)
Aeolochroma purpurissa (Warren, 1906)
Aeolochroma quadrilinea (Lucas, 1892) (=Actenochroma ochrea (Warren, 1896))
Aeolochroma rhodochlora (Goldfinch, 1929)
Aeolochroma subrubella (Warren, 1903)
Aeolochroma subrubescens (Warren, 1896)
Aeolochroma unitaria (Walker, 1860)
Aeolochroma viridicata (Lucas, 1890)

References

External links

Pseudoterpnini
Geometridae genera
Moths described in 1912
Taxa named by Louis Beethoven Prout